Verdell Jackson (born April 1, 1941) is an American educator, rancher and politician from Montana. He is a former Republican member of the Montana House of Representatives and the Montana State Senate from District 5, representing Kalispell, Montana.

Early life and education
Jackson was born in Cortez, Colorado.

In 1964, Jackson earned a Bachelor of Science  degree from the University of Colorado, followed by a Master of Arts degree from Arizona State University in 1970.

Career 
In 1964, Jackson became a high school teacher, a profession he held until 1970. From 1970-72 he worked as an instructor at the University of Alaska. In 1991, he became a superintendent at Flathead Christian School, until 1996. Jackson was also a rancher.

In 1998, Jackson began serving in the Montana House of Representatives.

On November 5, 2002, Jackson won the election unopposed and became a Republican member of Montana House of Representatives for District 79.

On November 2, 2004, Jackson won the election and became a Republican member of Montana House of Representatives for District 6. He defeated Shannon Hanson with 64.71% of the votes.

On November 7, 2006, Jackson won the election and became a Republican member of the Montana Senate for District 5. He defeated Ric Smith with 59.54% of the votes.

Personal life 
Jackson's wife is Linda Jackson. They have one child. Jackson and his family live in Kalispell, Montana.

See also 
 Montana House of Representatives, District 6

References

External links
 Verdell Jackson at ballotpedia.org
 REP. VERDELL JACKSON (R) - HD79
 Home page
 Senator Verdell Jackson With His Endorsements for the Montana Primary (2020)
 Verdell Jackson at flatheadcd.org (term expires 2022)

Living people
1941 births
American educators
Educators from Montana
Republican Party members of the Montana House of Representatives
Republican Party Montana state senators
People from Cortez, Colorado
Politicians from Kalispell, Montana
University of Colorado alumni
Arizona State University alumni